Zsolt Tar (born 13 February 1993) is a Hungarian professional footballer who plays for FC Ajka.

Club statistics

Updated to games played as of 9 August 2020.

References
  
 Tar Zsolt at HLSZ.hu 
 

1993 births
Living people
People from Kunhegyes
Hungarian footballers
Association football defenders
Fehérvár FC players
Puskás Akadémia FC players
Nemzeti Bajnokság I players
Nemzeti Bajnokság II players
Győri ETO FC players
Csákvári TK players
FC Ajka players
Sportspeople from Jász-Nagykun-Szolnok County